The Shrine of Our Lady of Sorrows is a church in the Stary Wielisław, Poland.

The history of the church dates to the tenth century, although the current structure dates only to the 15th century.  It is one of the eight International shrines of the Roman Catholic Church.

The Church has its in possession the relics of the Holy Cross, St. Catherine of Alexandria and a replica of nails which were nailed to the cross of Jesus.

From 22 October 2011, the relics of Bl. Pope John Paul II are also venerated here.

References

Catholic pilgrimage sites
Catholic devotions
Kłodzko County
Roman Catholic churches in Poland